The Metropolitan Police Act 1839 (2 & 3 Vict c 47) is an Act of the Parliament of the United Kingdom. The Act enlarged the district of, and gave greatly increased powers to the Metropolitan Police established by the Metropolitan Police Act 1829. It is one of the Metropolitan Police Acts 1829 to 1895.

Section 2 of the Act allowed for the enlargement of the Metropolitan Police District to include places in a radius of 24 km from Charing Cross.

Section 5 gave constables of the Metropolitan Police all "powers and privileges of constabulary" in the counties of Berkshire and Buckinghamshire and on the River Thames within or adjoining Middlesex, Surrey, Berkshire, Essex, Kent and the City of London (the MPA 1829 had already given them constabulary powers within Middlesex, Surrey, Essex and Kent).

The Act gave the police force powers over shipping arriving in the Port of London and using the Thames. Among these powers were:
 Power to inspect vessels to prevent smuggling
 Power to seize unlawful quantities of gunpowder
 Powers to seize guns loaded with ball

A number of activities were to regulated within the Metropolitan Police District:
 Fairs were only to be open during agreed hours.
 Public houses were to closed on Sundays, Christmas Day and on Good Friday until 1 pm. No alcoholic drink was to be sold to persons under 16 years of age.
 Police were empowered to enter unlicensed theatres.
 Police could enter premises where bear baiting or cockfighting were being carried on, and fine the participants £5.
 Police were allowed to enter gaming houses.
 Regulations could be made to prevent the obstruction of parades and processions.

Section 54 of the Act enumerated a long list of "Nuisances by Persons in Thoroughfares" that were now prohibited. Among the outlawed activities, for which the miscreant could be taken into custody and fined, were:
 "Furious Driving".
 Driving carts on the footway.
 Selling or distributing "profane, indecent or obscene books, papers, prints, drawings, paintings or representations", or singing any songs or ballads with similar content or using language "to the annoyance of pedestrians or passengers".
 Threatening or abusive behaviour or words.
 The blowing of horns (except by guards and postmen of the General Post Office).
 Discharging firearms, setting fireworks or lighting bonfires.
 "Wantonly disturbing" persons by ringing doorbells, knocking on doors or unlawfully extinguishing lamps.
 Flying kites or playing games to the annoyance of others.
 Making slides upon ice or snow to the danger of pedestrians.

The Act also outlawed the use of dog carts, obliged street musicians to move on when asked and allowed the imprisonment of "drunkards guilty of riotous or indecent behaviour".

References

Further reading
 Finer, Samuel Edward. The life and times of Sir Edwin Chadwick (1952)  excerpt pp 164–80.

External links

United Kingdom Acts of Parliament 1839
History of the Metropolitan Police
1839 in London
Acts of the Parliament of the United Kingdom concerning London
Police legislation in the United Kingdom